The 2019 Sandwell Metropolitan Borough Council election took place on 2 May 2019 to elect members of Sandwell Metropolitan Borough Council in England.  This was on the same day as other local elections.

Results summary

Ward results

Abbey

Blackheath

Bristnall

Charlemont with Grove Vale

Cradley Heath and Old Hill

Friar Park

Great Barr with Yew Tree

Great Bridge

Great Green and Lyng

Hateley Heath

Langley

Newton

Oldbury

Old Warley

Princes End

Rowley

Smethwick

Soho and Victoria

St. Paul's

Tipton Green

Tividale

Wednesbury North

Wednesbury South

West Bromwich Central

References

2019 English local elections
2019
2010s in the West Midlands (county)